Seyyed Khalaf may refer to:
 Seyyed Khalaf, Dasht-e Azadegan
 Seyyed Khalaf, Shush